Farida Yasmin (3 February 19408 August 2015) was a Bangladeshi playback singer.

Early life
Yasmin was born in Murshidabad at her maternal grandparents' house. Yasmin took lessons from her mother, Mouluda Khatun and from Durgaprasad Roy, and  Ustad Moti Miya.

In 1959 she debuted her playback singer career in the film "E Desh Tomar Amar".

Personal life
Yasmin was married to writer Qazi Anwar Hussain. She has four sisters – Nilufar Yasmin, Fauzia Yasmin, Nazma Yasmin, and Sabina Yasmin, all of them are notable singers.

References

External links
 

1940 births
2015 deaths
20th-century Bangladeshi women singers
20th-century Bangladeshi singers
Singers from West Bengal